{{DISPLAYTITLE:C18H30O2}}
The molecular formula C18H30O2 may refer to:

 Octadecatrienoic acid
 Calendic acid
 Catalpic acid
 α-Eleostearic acid
 β-Eleostearic acid
 Jacaric acid
 α-Linolenic acid
 γ-Linolenic acid
 Pinolenic acid
 Punicic acid
 Ximenynic acid